Båkeneset Headland is an ice-covered headland, marked by Båken Nunatak near the seaward end, forming the northwest extremity of Ahlmann Ridge in Queen Maud Land. It was mapped by Norwegian cartographers from surveys and from air photos by the Norwegian-British-Swedish Antarctic Expedition(1949–52), and from air photos by the Norwegian expedition (1958–59), and named "Båkeneset" (the "beacon cape").

References
 

Headlands of Queen Maud Land
Princess Martha Coast